William Jordyn may refer to:

William Jordyn (died 1602), MP for Shaftesbury
William Jordyn (died 1623), MP for Westbury

See also
William Jordan (disambiguation)
William Jorden